is a railway station in Higashi-ku, Hamamatsu,  Shizuoka Prefecture, Japan, operated by the private railway company, Enshū Railway.

Lines
Sekishi Station is a station on the  Enshū Railway Line and is 7.8 kilometers from the starting point of the line at Shin-Hamamatsu Station.

Station layout
The station has a single island platform connected to the station building by a level crossing. The station building has automated ticket machines, and automated turnstiles which accept the NicePass smart card, as well as ET Card, a magnetic card ticketing system. The station is unattended.

Platforms

Adjacent stations

|-
!colspan=5|Enshū Railway

Station history
In 1926, the station was renamed . It gained its present name in June 1964. The station has been unattended since 1974.

Passenger statistics
In fiscal 2017, the station was used by an average of 907 passengers daily (boarding passengers only).

Surrounding area
Sekishi Elementary School
 Sekishi Junior High School

See also
 List of railway stations in Japan

References

External links

 Enshū Railway official website

Railway stations in Japan opened in 1909
Railway stations in Shizuoka Prefecture
Railway stations in Hamamatsu
Stations of Enshū Railway